The Houston Press was a Scripps Howard daily afternoon newspaper, founded in 1911, in Houston, Texas. Under the leadership of founding editor Paul C. Edwards (1911–16), Marcellus E. Foster, known as "Mefo" (1927–37), and George Carmack (1946–64), the newspaper developed a reputation for flashy stories about violence and sex and for exposés of political malfeasance. It ceased publication in 1964.

History 
The Houston Press was first issued September 25, 1911, from a plant at 709 Louisiana Street, for 1 cent a copy. For the first fiftyeight days, the Press had no advertising; its management 
asserted that its circulation had yet to warrant investment of any advertiser's money.

Notable former staff members included Walter Cronkite, who later became the CBS news anchor; Thomas Thompson, author of Hearts and Blood and Money; Donald Forst, later editor of Newsday and The Village Voice; Pulitzer Prize-winning reporter and biographer Vance Trimble; columnists Sig Byrd ("The Stroller") and Carl Victor Little (1894–1959) ("By The Way"); gossip columnist Maxine Mesinger; and television crusader Marvin Zindler, who once worked there as a photographer covering crime stories. Joseph Agris, who became Zindler's biographer, called the Houston Press "a paper that, by journalistic standards, had no standards at all" and Clyde Waddell who was a chief photographer in 1943.

Closure of the Press in 1964 
In 1963, the year before it closed, the Press had an average daily circulation (Monday–Saturday) of 90,400, and employed 320 people. On March 20, 1964, editor Carmack and Business Manager Ray L. Powers announced that the newspaper, plant, and facilities had been sold to the larger of its two rivals Houston Chronicle for $4.5 million (equivalent to $ million in ). The Press had never missed a publication since it was founded. Following the closure of the Press, two Houston daily newspapers remained, the morning Houston Post and the evening Houston Chronicle (1964 average daily circulation of 226,600). Houston, before the closing of the Press, had been the only city west of the Mississippi River with more than two daily newspapers.

Houston Press selected personnel

Editors 
In its 52-year history The Press had six editors:

Managing editors

Journalists

Artists, illustrators, cartoonists

Business managers

Houston Press buildings 
Beginning May 1913, the Press moved from 709 Louisiana Street to a new building at Capitol Avenue and Bagby Street. In 1928, the Houston Press erected a $500,000 (estimated equivalent of $ in ) two-story,  building (which formally opened February 14, 1928) at the corner of Rusk and Chartres Streets (2001 Rusk Street). It was designed in an Italianate-style by Howell & Thomas, a Cleveland firm.
 2 photos

Selected articles

Bibliography

Notes

References

 
 .

 
 , .
 

 
 
 

 
 
 
 
 

  (publication),  (publication),  (article).
 

 

 
 
  (U.S. Newsstream database).
 

 

 
 
 

 .

 

External links 
 
 
 John T. Jones, Jr. Business and Personal Papers, Rice University → "Purchase of Houston Press 1964" → Sub-series A: Houston Chronicle → Box 1 → Folder 15.

Newspapers established in 1911
Publications disestablished in 1964
Newspapers published in Houston
Defunct newspapers published in Texas
1911 establishments in Texas
1964 disestablishments in Texas
Daily newspapers published in Texas